Cuptoare may refer to several villages in Romania:

 Cuptoare, a district in the city of Reșița, Caraş-Severin County
 Cuptoare, a village in Cornea Commune, Caraş-Severin County